Association football is the most popular sport in Indonesia, in terms of annual attendance, participation and revenue. It is played on all levels, from children to middle-aged men. Liga 1, the Indonesian domestic league is popular. The national body is the Football Association of Indonesia (PSSI). The Indonesian football league started around 1930 in the Dutch colonial era.

Indonesia Football Association

The governing body is the Football Association of Indonesia (PSSI). PSSI organises the men's, women's, and futsal national teams, as well as the Indonesian League.

Indonesian League System

In 1993, PSSI combined the existing "Galatama" which was a semi-professional competition and an amateur competition "Perserikatan" to be a single professional competition for football clubs, known as the Indonesian League (Liga Indonesia). From 1994 to 2007, the format of the top division competition was a combination of double round-robin format and a single eliminations second round for several top teams of the table to decide the champions. Starting from 2008–09 season onwards, the competition format changed into a more common system that is also being used in most European football leagues. The single elimination round was removed and the competition has become a full double round-robin league system. The name also changed into Indonesia Super League. Since 2017, the top league is named Liga 1.

Men's team

On the international stage, Indonesia experienced limited success despite being the first Asian team to qualify for the FIFA World Cup. In 1938, they played as the Dutch East Indies. Losing 0–6 to Hungary in a then-direct knockout stage, Indonesia became the only country to play only one match in the World Cup and has never qualified again since.

In 1956, the football team played in the Summer Olympics and earned a hard-fought 0–0 draw against then footballing superpower Soviet Union, led by the legendary Lev Yashin playing under the goal for them, before losing 0–4 on the replay match. On the continental level, Indonesia won the bronze medal in the 1958 Asian Games. Indonesia's first appearance in Asian Cup was back in 1996. With a draw against Kuwait in their first match and two defeats in the following two matches against Korea Republic and the host, UAE, Indonesia finished bottom of group A with a solitary point. In 2000, they again forced a draw against Kuwait, but then lost to China and the Korea Republic.

In 2004, the national team recorded their first-ever win in the Asian Cup against Qatar, but the dreams of the nation of going to the second round were shattered due to the defeats against China and Bahrain in the following group games. Indonesia beat Bahrain in 2007 AFC Asian Cup as one of the four co-hosts but the qualification dream was again shattered after two defeats by Asian superpowers Saudi Arabia and for the third time against the Korea Republic. However, Indonesia failed to qualify to the 2011 AFC Asian Cup in Qatar after finishing bottom of Group B in the qualifiers without winning any single match. Indonesia managed to qualify to the 2023 AFC Asian Cup in Qatar after 16 years of waiting.

The youth teams occasionally qualified for the AFC U-20 Asian Cup (U-20 team) and AFC U-17 Asian Cup (U-17 team). The U-19 team is the only Indonesian team to ever win continental-level tournament, share-winning the U-19 Championship in 1961 with Burma. The team is also the only one to qualify for a FIFA tournament under the name "Indonesia", playing in the 1979 U-20 World Cup and being scheduled to play again in the 2023 FIFA U-20 World Cup in which they automatically qualified as host.

Clubs

Indonesia has 7 traditional football teams where all of them are the founders of PSSI, the Indonesian football association. The seven teams are, Persib Bandung, Persija Jakarta, Persis Solo, Persebaya Surabaya, PSIS Semarang, PSIM Yogyakarta, and PSM Madiun. These seven teams are regulated directly in the rules of the Indonesian football federation where these seven teams are not allowed to change their name or change their logo significantly.

PSM Makassar is the oldest professional football team in Indonesia, it was founded in 2 November 1905 under the name Makassaarsche Voetbal Bond. Meanwhile, the oldest amateur and also oldest football club in Indonesia is UNI Bandung, which was founded in 1903 and is now an internal club under the auspices of Persib Bandung.

Women's football

The country has never qualified for any FIFA women's tournament. However, the team has twice finished as high as fourth in the AFC Women's Asian Cup, in 1977 and 1986.

In December 2017, Women's Football Association of Indonesia (ASBWI) was created in their first congress in Palembang.

In 2019 Liga 1 Putri was launched as the top-flight women's football league in Indonesia.

Criticisms

Despite having a reputation as one of the most passionate fans, Indonesia also has a reputation for violent hooliganism. Since the 1990s, the Indonesian football league has had 74 fan related deaths. On the world stage, Indonesia also has an intense rivalry with  Malaysia. Fans of the two teams regularly have fights, with the recent case happening during the 2022 FIFA World Cup qualification (AFC), in which Indonesian fans harassed and provoking the Malaysian fans during their defeat at their home ground, Gelora Bung Karno Stadium. After the 2019 Southeast Asian Games, Indonesian fans also took to social media to insult, harass, and send death threats to Vietnamese players, and even their families, in response to the loss in the final to Vietnam. Indonesia have been warned and banned several times by FIFA due to their act of hooliganism and sometimes having their government intervening on PSSI.

The third biggest football disaster in the world also occurred in Indonesia. Violence reoccurred at Kanjuruhan Stadium in Malang, where 135 people died and hundreds were injured. The incident began when Aremania, Arema supporters who did not accept that their team suffered defeat against their rival, Persebaya. Where riots spread in the stands to exit the stadium. The police threw tear gas and caused the death in the stadium.

Largest football stadiums in Indonesia

See also
 Indonesia national football team
 Indonesia women's national football team
 Indonesia national futsal team
 Indonesia Pro Futsal League

References

External links
 The Official Indonesian Football Association website
 Indonesia on FIFA
 Football Indonesia podcast (English)